A pipe support or pipe hanger is a designed element that transfer the load from a pipe to the supporting structures. The load includes the weight of the pipe proper, the content that the pipe carries, all the pipe fittings attached to pipe, and the pipe covering such as insulation. The four main functions of a pipe support are to anchor, guide, absorb shock, and support a specified load. Pipe supports used in high or low temperature applications may contain insulation materials. The overall design configuration of a pipe support assembly is dependent on the loading and operating conditions.

Loads on piping system

Primary load 

These are typically steady or sustained types of loads such as internal fluid pressure, external pressure, gravitational forces acting on the pipe such as weight of pipe and fluid, forces due to relief or blow down, pressure waves generated due to water/steam hammer effects.

Sustained loads:

 Internal/External Pressure: A pipe used for transporting fluid would be under internal pressure load. A pipe such as a jacketed pipe core or tubes in a Shell & Tube ex-changer etc. may be under net external pressure. Internal or external pressure induces stresses in the axial as well as circumferential (Hoop Stress) directions. The pressure also induces stresses in the radial direction, but these are often neglected. The internal pressure exerts an axial force equal to pressure times the internal cross section of the pipe. F =P[πd^2/4]. If outer diameter is used for calculating approximate metal cross-section as Pressure well as pipe cross-section, the axial stress can often be approximated as follows : S =Pd /(4t)
 Dead weight: It is the self weight of pipe including fluid, weight of fittings & other inline components (say valve, insulation etc.). This type of loads act throughout the life cycle of pipe. In horizontal pipes, these loads cause bending, and the bending moment is related to normal and shear stresses. Pipe bending is caused mainly due to two reasons: distributed weight load (e.g. fluid weight) and concentrated weight load (e.g. valve weight). The weight of risers (vertical sections of pipe) can be supported by riser clamps.

Occasional loads:

 Wind load: Piping which are located outdoors and thus exposed to wind will be designed to withstand the maximum wind velocity expected during the plant operating life. Wind force is modeled as a uniform load acting upon the projected length of the pipe perpendicular to the direction of the wind. Wind pressure for various elevations will be used to calculate wind force using the following formula. Fw = Pw x S x A, where Fw = The total wind force, Pw = The equivalent wind pressure, S = Wind shape factor, A = Pipe exposed area.
 Seismic load: Seismic load is one of the basic concepts of earthquake engineering which means application of an earthquake-generated agitation to a structure. It happens at contact surfaces of a structure either with the ground,[2] or with adjacent structures,[3] or with gravity waves from tsunami.
 Water hammer: Water hammer (or more generally, fluid hammer) is a pressure surge or wave caused when a fluid (usually a liquid but sometimes also a gas) in motion is forced to stop or change direction suddenly (momentum change). Water hammer commonly occurs when a valve closes suddenly at an end of a pipeline system, and a pressure wave propagates in the pipe. It's also called hydraulic shock.
 Steam hammer: Steam hammer, the pressure surge generated by transient flow of super-heated or saturated steam in a steam-line due to sudden stop valve closures is considered as an occasional load. Though the flow is transient, for the purpose of piping stress analysis, only the unbalanced force along the pipe segment tending to induce piping vibration is calculated and applied on the piping model as static equivalent force.
 Safety valve Discharge: Reaction forces from relief valve discharge is considered as an occasional load. The reaction force due to steady state flow following the opening of safety relief valve in an open discharge installation can be calculated in accordance with ASME B31.1 Appendix II and applied on the piping model as static equivalent force.

Secondary load 

Just as the primary loads have their origin in some force, secondary loads are caused by displacement of some kind. For example, the pipe connected to a storage tank may be under load if the tank nozzle to which it is connected moves down due to tank settlement. Similarly, pipe connected to a vessel is pulled upwards because the vessel nozzle moves up due to vessel expansion. Also, a pipe may vibrate due to vibrations in the rotating equipment it is attached to.

Displacement loads:

 Load due to thermal expansion of pipe
 Load due to thermal movement of equipment

A pipe may experience expansion or contraction once it is subjected to temperatures higher or lower respectively as compared to temperature at which it was assembled. The secondary loads are often cyclic but not always. For example, load due to tank settlement is not cyclic. The load due to vessel nozzle movement during operation is cyclic because the displacement is withdrawn during shut-down and resurfaces again after fresh start-up. A pipe subjected to a cycle of hot and cold fluid similarly undergoes cyclic loads and deformation.

Types of pipe supports 

 Rigid support
 Spring support
 Snubber/Shock absorber

Rigid support 
Rigid supports are used to restrict pipe in certain direction(s) without any flexibility (in that direction). Main function of a rigid support can be Anchor, Rest, Guide or both Rest & Guide.

1) Stanchion/pipe shoe:

Rigid support can be provided either from bottom or top. In case of bottom supports generally a  stanchion or Pipe Clamp Base is used. It can be simply kept on steel structure for only rest type supports. To simultaneously restrict in another direction separate plate or Lift up Lug can be used. A pipe anchor is a rigid support that restricts movement in all three orthogonal directions and all three rotational directions, i.e. restricting al the 6 degrees of freedom This usually is a welded stanchion that is welded or bolted to steel or concrete. In case of anchor which is bolted to concrete, a special type of bolt is required called Anchor Bolt, which is used to hold the support with concrete. In this type of support, normal force and friction force can become significant. To alleviate the frictional effect Graphite Pad or PTFE plates are used when required.

2) Rod hanger:

It is a static restraint i.e. it is designed to withstand tensile load only (no compression load should be exerted on it, in such case buckling may take place). It is rigid vertical type support provide from top only. It consists of clamp, eye nut, tie rod, beam attachment. Selection of rod hanger depends on pipe size, load, temperature, insulation, assembly length etc. As it comes with hinge and clamp, no substantial frictional force comes into play.

3) Rigid strut:

It is a dynamic component i.e. designed to withstand both tensile and compression load. strut can be provide in vertical as well as horizontal direction. V-type Strut can be used to restrict two degrees of freedom. It consists of stiff clamp, rigid strut, welding clevis. Selection depends on pipe size, load, temperature, insulation, assembly length. As it comes with hinge and clamp, no substantial frictional force comes into play.

Spring support 
Spring supports (or flexible supports) use helical coil compression springs (to accommodate loads and associated pipe movements due to thermal expansion). They are broadly classified into variable or constant effort support. The critical component in both the type of supports are helical coil compression springs.
Spring hanger & supports usually use helical coil compression springs. 

1.Variable spring hanger or variable effort support:

Variable effort supports also known as variable hangers or variables are used to support pipe lines subjected to moderate (approximately up to 50mm) vertical thermal movements. VES units (Variable effort supports) are used to support the weight of pipe work or equipment along with weight of fluids ( gases are considered weightless) while allowing certain quantum of movement with respect to the structure supporting it. Spring supports may also be used to support lines subject to relative movements occurring typically due to subsidence or earthquakes. A VES unit is fairly simple in construction with the pipe virtually suspended directly from a helical coil compression spring as the cut away sectional sketch shows below. The main components being:
 Top plate
 Pressure plate or piston plate
 Bottom plate or base plate
 Helical spring
 Turnbuckle assembly
 Locking rods
 Name plate
 Can section or cover

Normally clients / engineering consultants will furnish the following data when issuing inquiries for variable effort units.
 Hot load
 Thermal movement (with direction i.e. up or + & down or -)
 Maximum load variation as a percentage (LV % max), if max LV is not specified then it is assumed to be 25% as per MM-SP58.
 Support types i.e. whether hanging type, foot mounted type etc.
 Special features such as travel limit stop required if any.
 Preferred surface protection / paint / finish.

Hot load is the working load of the support in the “Hot” condition i.e. when the pipe has traveled from the cold condition to the hot or working condition. Normally MSS-SP58 specifies max Load Variation ( popularly called LV) as 25%.

Salient features-
 Allows movement in vertical direction
 Load on pipe varies with movement
Used where
 Displacement   < 50mm
 Load variability < 25%
 Rod angulation should be less than 4°

Load variation (LV) or percentage variation =[(hot load ~cold load) x 100]/hot load or load variation (LV) or percentage variation =[(travel x spring rate) x 100]/Hot Load
Generally spring supports are provided from top but due to layout feasibility or any other reason Base Mounted type support is fixed to floor or structure & the pipe is made to “sit” on top of the flange of the spring support.

2.Constant spring hanger or constant effort support:

When confronted with large vertical movements typically 150 mm or 250 mm, there is no choice but to select a constant effort support (CES). When the Load variation percentage exceeds 25% or the specified max LV% in a variable hanger, it is choice less but to go for a CES. For pipes which are critical to the performance of the system or so called critical piping where no residual stresses are to be transferred to the pipe it is a common practice to use CES.
In a constant effort support the load remains constant when the pipe moves from its cold position to the hot position. Thus irrespective of travel the load remains constant over the complete range of movement. Therefore, it is called a constant load hanger. Compared to a variable load hanger where with movement the load varies & the hot load & cold load are two different values governed by the travel & spring constant. A CES unit does not have any spring rate.

Most prevalent work principle for CSH is a bell crank mechanism. The bell crank lever rotates around the fulcrum point. One end of the Bell crank lever is connected to the pipe ‘P’, the other end is connected to the spring by the tie rod. Thus when the pipe moves down from cold to hot condition, the point P moves down, and as it moves down the Bell crank lever will rotate in the anti-clockwise direction & tie rod connected to the spring will be pulled in, by which the spring gets further compressed. When the pipe moves up the bell crank lever will rotate (in the clockwise direction) & the tie rod connected to spring will be pushed out thus allowing the spring to expand or relax.

Another popular principle is three spring or adjusting spring mechanism. In this case one main vertical spring takes the main load of the pipe. There are situated other two spring with horizontal orientation to balance any extra load coming in upward or downward direction.

Snubber or shock absorber 
Dynamic Restraints: The restraint system performs an entirely different function to that of the supports. The latter is intended to carry the weight of the pipe work and allow it to move freely under normal operating conditions.
The restraint system is intended to protect the pipe work, the plant and the structure from abnormal conditions; it should not impede the function of the supports. Conditions that necessitate the use of restraints are as follows –
• Earthquake.
• Fluid disturbance.
• Certain system functions.
• Environmental influences.
In areas that are situated on or near to geological fault lines it is common practice to protect the plant from potential earthquake activity. In such plant there will be a very large requirement for dynamic restraints. Fluid disturbance can be caused by the effect of pumps and compressors or occasionally fluid in a liquid state entering a pipe intended for the transportation of gas or steam. Some system functions such as rapid valve closure, pulsation due to pumping and the operation of safety relief valves will cause irregular and sudden loading patterns within the piping system. The environment can cause disturbance due to high wind load or in the case of offshore oil and gas rigs, impact by ocean waves.
The restraint system will be designed to cater for all of these influences. A restraint is a device that prevents either the pipe work or the plant to which the pipe work is connected being damaged due to the occurrence of any one or more of the above
phenomenon. It is designed to absorb and transfer sudden increases in load from the pipe into the building structure and to deaden any opposing oscillation between the pipe and the structure. Therefore, dynamic restraints are required to be very stiff, to have high load capacity and to minimize free movement between pipe and structure.

Depending on working principle, snubbers can be classified as

 Hydraulic snubber: Similar to an automobile shock arrestor the hydraulic snubber is built around a cylinder containing hydraulic fluid with a piston that displaces the fluid from one end of the cylinder to the other. Displacement of fluid results from the movement of the pipe causing the piston to displace within the cylinder resulting in high pressure in one end of the cylinder and a relatively low pressure in the other. The velocity of the piston will dictate the actual difference in pressure. The fluid passes through a spring-loaded valve, the spring being used to hold the valve open. If the differential pressure across the valve exceeds the effective pressure exerted by the spring, the valve will close. This causes the snubber to become rigid and further displacement is substantially prevented. The hydraulic snubber is normally used when the axis of restraint is in the direction of expansion and contraction of the pipe. The snubber is therefore required to extend or retract with the normal operation of the pipe work. The snubber has low resistance to movement at very low velocities.
 Mechanical snubber: Whilst having the same application as the hydraulic snubber, retardation of the pipe is due to centrifugal braking within the snubber. A split flywheel is made to rotate at high velocity causing steel balls to be forced radially outwards. The flywheel is forced apart by the steel balls causing braking plates to come together thus retarding the axial displacement of the snubber. Rotation of the flywheel is generated by the linear displacement of the main rod acting on a ball-screw or similar device. It is also very expensive.
 A shock absorber absorbs energy of sudden impulses or dissipate energy from the pipeline. For damper and dashpot, see Shock absorber
 An insulated pipe support (also called pre-insulated pipe support) is a load-bearing member and minimizes energy dissipation. Insulated pipe supports can be designed for vertical, axial and/or lateral loading combinations in both low and high temperature applications. Adequately insulating the pipeline increases the efficiency of the piping system by not allowing the "cold" inside to escape to the environment. For insulated pipe, see Insulated pipe

 An engineered spring support upholds a specific load, including the weight of the pipe, commodity, flanges, valves, refractory, and insulation. Spring supports also allow the supported load to travel through a predetermined thermal deflection cycle from its installed condition to its operational condition.

Materials 
Pipe supports are fabricated from a variety of materials including structural steel, carbon steel, stainless steel, galvanized steel, aluminum, ductile iron and FRP composites. Most pipe supports are coated to protect against moisture and corrosion. Some methods for corrosion protection include: painting, zinc coatings, hot dip galvanizing or a combination of these. In the case of FRP composite pipe supports, the elements required to form a corrosion cell aren't present, so no additional coatings or protections are necessary.

Standards 
 Design: ASME B31.1, ASME B31.3, ASME Section VIII Pressure Vessels
 Manufacturing: MSS-SP58 (Material, Design, Manufacture, Selection, Application & Installation.  Note:MSS SP-58-2009 Incorporates and Supersedes the contents of ANSI/MSS SP-69-2003, MSS SP-77, MSS SP-89, and MSS SP-90), AWS-D1.1, ASTM-A36, ASTM-A53, ASTM-A120, ASTM-A123 and A446, ASTM-A125, ASTM-A153, ASTM-307 and A325, ASTM-C916, ASTM-D1621, ASTM-D1622, ASTM-D1623.  Supports with insulation inserts must also reference ASTM-C585.
 Quality Systems: ISO 9001, ASQC Q-92, CAN3 Z299
 Testing: ANSI B18.2.3

References 

Structural connectors